Yingdong District  is a district of the city of Fuyang, Anhui Province, China.

Administrative divisions
In the present, Yingdong District has 3 subdistricts, 7 towns and 2 townships.
3 subdistricts
 Xinhua
 Xiangyang
 Hedong

7 towns

2 townships
 Zaozhuang
 Yanglouzi

References

Fuyang